The Henry H. and Bertha Sterzing Ziller House is a historic residence in Austin, Texas.  It was originally built circa 1877 and purchased by the Zillers in 1881.  It was added to the National Register of Historic Places in 1998.  It is located at 1110 Blanco St.

References

Houses on the National Register of Historic Places in Texas
Houses in Austin, Texas
National Register of Historic Places in Austin, Texas
Recorded Texas Historic Landmarks
City of Austin Historic Landmarks
1877 establishments in Texas